NAS Whiting Field - North , also known as North Whiting Field, is located four miles (6 km) north of the central business district of Milton, a city in Santa Rosa County, Florida, United States. It is one of two airfields located at Naval Air Station Whiting Field, the other airfield being NAS Whiting Field - South. VT-2, VT-3, and VT-6 of Training Air Wing Five use North Field for Primary fixed-wing training in the Beechcraft T-6 Texan II.

Facilities 
Whiting Field NAS North has two asphalt paved runways:
 Runway 5/23: 6,000 x 200 ft (1,829 x 61 m)
 Runway 14/32: 6,000 x 200 ft (1,829 x 61 m)

See also 
 Naval Air Station Whiting Field
 NAS Whiting Field - South
 List of airports by IATA code: N

References

External links 
NAS Whiting Field (official site)
NAS Whiting Field page at GlobalSecurity.org

Whiting Field
Airports in Florida
Transportation buildings and structures in Santa Rosa County, Florida